Oscar Edward Cesare (October 7, 1883 – July 25, 1948) was a Swedish-born American caricaturist, painter, draftsman and editorial cartoonist.

Biography
Cesare was born on 7 October 1883 in Linköping, Sweden. At eighteen he moved to Paris to study art, then traveled to Buffalo, New York, to continue his studies.  In 1903 he moved to Chicago, and by 1911 he was living in Manhattan, New York.

One of his first jobs was illustrating The King of Gee-Whiz by Emerson Hough in 1906.  By 1913, his success as an illustrator allowed him to exhibit at the legendary 1913 Armory Show.  Cesare worked at several publications throughout his career, including the Chicago Tribune, New York World, New York Sun, New York Evening Post, Our World, The Century Magazine, Bookman, Outlook, Nation's Business, Literary Digest, Fortune, and The New Yorker.  In 1920, he became a regular contributor to the Sunday magazine of the New York Times and continued until a few years before his death in 1948.

In October 1922 Cesare had the very rare privilege of gaining admittance to the Kremlin to paint sketches of the Soviet leader Vladimir Lenin. He was also able to make sketches of Leon Trotsky on the same trip.

He died on July 25, 1948 in Stamford, Connecticut.

Style
Cesare was active in opposing World War I.  He adopted the grease crayon technique that had been adopted by other radical cartoonists such as Boardman Robinson, Robert Minor, K. R. Chamberlain, and Rollin Kirby.

Personal life
On July 15, 1916, Cesare married Margaret Porter, the daughter of the American writer O. Henry.  They divorced four years later.

External links

 
 
 Works by Cesare at the Library of Congress
 Oscar Cesare Collection of original cartoons at the Albert and Shirley Small Special Collections Library
Billy Ireland Cartoon Library & Museum Art Database

Notes 

1880s births
1948 deaths
Swedish emigrants to the United States
American caricaturists
American editorial cartoonists
20th-century American painters
American male painters
People from Linköping
20th-century American male artists